Zabeel (25 October 1986 – 25 September 2015) was a New Zealand-bred racehorse who predominantly raced in Australia. He was retired to stud and became a champion sire.  He is a bay son of Sir Tristram (IRE) from the Nureyev mare Lady Giselle.  During his racing career, he won seven races, including the Moonee Valley Stakes in 1989 and the Australian Guineas, the Alister Clark Stakes, and the Craiglee Stakes in 1990.

After retiring to stud in 1991, he sired 153 individual stakes winners of 350 stakes races, including Vengeance of Rain, who won the Dubai Sheema Classic and holds the earnings record in Hong Kong.  Zabeel has also sired the Australian champions Octagonal and Might And Power, who won 17 Group One races between them, including the Caulfield and Melbourne Cups, two Cox Plates, three runnings of the Mercedes Classic, and the Sydney three-year-old triple crown.

One of Zabeel's half-brothers, Baryshnikov (by Kenmare), also won the Australian Guineas (in 1995) and retired to stud, while another winning half-brother, Break The Vault (by Redoute's Choice), entered stud in 2006.

Zabeel died in his paddock at Cambridge Stud on 25 September 2015, and was buried alongside his famous sire, Sir Tristram, in the stud's garden.

Progeny 
Zabeel's major race winners include:

Pedigree

See also
 Thoroughbred racing in Australia
 Thoroughbred racing in New Zealand
 List of millionaire racehorses in Australia
 List of historical horses

References

External links
 Zabeel's pedigree and partial racing stats

1986 racehorse births
2015 racehorse deaths
Racehorses bred in New Zealand
New Zealand Thoroughbred sires
Champion Thoroughbred Sires of Australia
Champion Thoroughbred Sires of New Zealand
Thoroughbred family 16-c